The Oops!... I Did It Again Tour (billed as Oops!... I Did It Again Tour 2000) was the third concert tour by American entertainer Britney Spears. It supported her second studio album, Oops!... I Did It Again (2000), and visited North America and Europe. The tour was announced in February 2000, while Spears was in the midst of the Crazy 2K Tour. The stage was much more elaborative than her previous tours and featured video screens, fireworks and moving platforms. The setlist was composed by songs from her first two studio albums, ...Baby One More Time and Oops!... I Did It Again as well as a few covers. Showco was the sound company, who used the PRISM system to adapt the show to each venue. Spears used a handheld microphone and a headset during the shows, while an ADAT was used to replace her voice during energetic dance routines.

The show consisted of four segments with each segment being followed by an interval to the next segment, and it ended with an encore. The show began with Spears descending from a giant orb. Most of the songs displayed energetic dance routines with the exception of the second segment, which featured mostly ballads. The encore consisted of a performance with fireworks. The Oops!... I Did It Again Tour received positive reviews from critics, who praised Spears's energy onstage as well as the band. It was also a commercial success, the reported dates by Billboard averaged $507,786 in grosses and nearly 15,841 in attendance, bringing a total of $43.6 million and more than 1.4 million of tickets and became one of the highest-grossing tours of 2000. The Oops!... I Did It Again Tour was broadcast by many channels around the world.
Former Wishbone star Mikaila was one of the opening acts for the tour.

Background
On February 22, 2000, Spears announced a summer tour in support of her second studio album, Oops!... I Did It Again (2000). The tour marked the first time Spears toured Europe. She commented, "I'm going to go to Europe, and just basically go everywhere for six months, [...] I've never toured outside of the U.S. I've never experienced other fans in other places, and performing in front of them is going to be so exciting." Before the tour began, Forbes reported that concert promoter SFX Entertainment guaranteed her a minimum of $200,000 per show. Tour sponsors from the 2000 leg of the ...Baby One More Time Tour, Got Milk?, and Polaroid, remained. Clairol's Herbal Essences was also added as a sponsor. Spears recorded a song for the latter called "I've Got the Urge to Herbal" to be used on their radio campaign, though she chose to not attend a photoshoot for the product when she decided to support an 86-day strike by the Screen Actors Guild (SAG). She later donated $1 from each ticket sold from her Inglewood, California show on July 28, 2000 to the union. For the European Leg of the Tour, Spears originally was going to do a co-headlining tour with NSYNC following the group’s No Strings Attached Tour. Spears ended up touring the region solo.

Development
Jamie King was chosen as tour director. Tim Miller and Kevin Antunes served as director of production and musical director, respectively. Mark Foffano was chosen as the lightning director. Spears described the tour as "like a Broadway show". The setlist included material from her first studio album ...Baby One More Time (1999) as well as seven songs from Oops!... I Did It Again. Spears explained, "I've been singing the same material for so long now. It'll be nice to change it up a little bit." She also talked about her expectations for the tour, saying, "I can't wait. I'll have a world tour. I'm going to have more dancers, a bigger stage, more pyro... just a lot bigger". The proscenium stage was much more elaborate than the stage of her previous tour and included video screens, movable platforms and different props. It cost $2.2 million to build. The tone of the show varied from the beginning: for the performance of "Born to Make You Happy", Spears sang in a set resembling a children's bedroom, complete with large toys and a pillow fight routine. On the contrary, she unveiled a more sophisticated image for "Don't Let Me Be the Last to Know", and followed it with raunchy performances for "...Baby One More Time" and "Oops!... I Did It Again".

The sound equipment was provided by Showco who used the PRISM system, which adapted the show for each venue according to its height, width and the coverage required. The sound was mixed by Front of house engineer Monty Lee Wilkes on a combination of Yamaha PM4000 and PM3000 consoles, an unusual choice for Spears's shows. He used dbx 903 compressors for kick and snare drums. The compressors were also used on Spears's microphones, a Shure Beta 58A handheld and a Crown CM-311AE headset-mounted capsule. Spears's vocals were mostly live—pre-recorded vocals ran in parallel on an ADAT machine during the shows, and were used to replace her live microphone when the dance routines became too energetic for good voice control. Spears's band, backline technicians and monitor engineer Raza Sufi were all fitted with in-ear monitors and headset mics, enabling rapid and clear communications around the stage area. Spears did not use them, preferring the ambient sound of a battery of eight Showco SRM wedges spread across the downstage area. These were augmented by Showco SS full-range sidefills and a pair of one-by-18-inch subs on each side of the stage. Sufi also used a dbx 160A to limit Spears's louder moments, while backing vocalists were controlled by a duo of BSS DPR901 dynamic equalizers. Effects were limited to vocal and drum reverbs. Amplification for the wedges and the FOH system were all Crown-based, with a pair of drum stool shakers completing the line-up. All the cables used during the tour were brought from the US, even in Europe, something unusual in audio production.

Concert synopsis
The show began with the video introduction "The Britney Spears Experience", in which three images of Spears welcomed spectators to the show. Then, a giant metal orb was lowered onstage and lifted again to reveal Spears standing behind it, wearing a pink halter top (some shows It was orange), a side silver jacket, and glittery jeans. Spears started with two dance-oriented performances of "(You Drive Me) Crazy" and "Stronger". This was followed by "What U See (Is What U Get)" in which she removed her silver side jacket and she danced on a stripper pole wearing a pink cowboy hat. The act ended with Spears talking to the audience and sitting on a stool to perform "From the Bottom of My Broken Heart" with her guitarist Skip.

After she left the stage, there was a video interlude hosted by NSYNC (via screen) and Spears' two background singers (two female background dancers in Europe) in which contestants did different games in order to meet Spears. She appeared onstage to meet the chosen fan and then welcomed the audience into her bedroom. Wearing white pajamas and slippers, she performed "Born to Make You Happy", which included a dance segment near the end. She then continued with "Lucky" featuring her two background singers (two female background dancers during all the European show) helping Spears getting ready for a typical day. Halfway through the song during the dance break, her male dancers all dressed in navy sailor costumes do a routine before Spears continues the remainder of the song dressed as a ship captain. "Sometimes", in which changed back into her white pajamas and slippers (coincidentally an outfit similar to the one she wore in the music video of the song) and featured Spears' and her dancers throwing teddy bears, beach balls, and squirting the audience with water guns. At the end, she climbed the staircase and briefly spoke to the audience before moving into a performance of "Don't Let Me Be The Last To Know", for which she wore a long white dress trimmed with boa feathers (dressed up much like in the music video as Lucky).

A band interlude showcasing a mix of funk and progressive rock from her band followed, and Spears reappeared to perform her cover of Sonny & Cher's "The Beat Goes On." During the performance, she was lifted into the air wearing a kimono that covered most of the stage. She continued with "Don't Go Knockin' on My Door" (loosing the kimono wearing a full purple jumpsuit) and her cover of The Rolling Stones's "(I Can't Get No) Satisfaction", which ended with a dance sequence set to the original version.

Next, there was a dance interval in which the dancers showed their individual moves while their names appeared on the screens. Spears took the stage again in a conservative schoolgirl outfit to perform "...Baby One More Time." She ripped it off halfway through the song to reveal a cheerleader ensemble. Spears then thanked the audience, took a bow and left the stage. She returned shortly after (wearing a black two-piece jumpsuit imprinted with orange flames) to perform "Oops!... I Did It Again", that included an extended dance break after the second chorus, pyrotechnics and other special effects. She ended the performance disappearing through a tunnel of fire.

Reception
The show received  positive reviews from critics. Andrew Miller of The Pitch stated "[the concert] at Sandstone proved that many [of Spears's] criticisms are off-base observations from people who have never actually attended one of these stars' shows. The music came from a talented band, not a DAT, and the bass lines to such songs as "... Baby One More Time" and "The Beat Goes On" rose to a funky growl in the live setting. For another, Spears' vocals were the real thing, as she sang in an alluringly low tone [...] but capably hit the high notes [...], however, she left the upper-octave duties to her background singers [...] during Spears' most strenuous dance routines". Richard Leiby of The Washington Post believed that the show "[was] great". Letta Tayler of Newsday said "For half the show, she remained the old Britney, the budding teen who dreamed of romance. But the rest of the time, she was a full-throttle tease, with sprayed- on clothes, a hard-edged attitude and a harder edge to her techno and hip-hop- coated pop to match".

Jon Pareles of The New York Times stated "What you get from this 18-year-old singer is a big smile, a little voice, gushes of sincerity, hardworking dance routines, shameless advertising and a determination to play both sides of pubescence for all they're worth". Jim Farber of New York Daily News commented that "Despite such spicy bits, the core of Britney's concert suffered from the familiarity and cheesiness of all teen road shows these days. The sparklers, explosions and mandatory flying dancers conformed to the corniness of theme park entertainment".  The ticket prices were set at $32 in North America. The reported dates averaged $507,786 in grosses and 15,841 in attendance. Susanne Ault of Billboard also reported that many of the shows sold out in one day. The tour had a total gross of $40.5 million. It became the tenth highest-grossing tour of the year in North America, as well as the second highest-grossing tour by a solo artist, only behind Tina Turner's Twenty Four Seven Tour. Roger Moore of the Orlando Sentinel analyzed Spears to emulate "a lot of Janet Jackson's old concert act and cleaned it up for a younger audience", also noting choreography resembling "Rhythm Nation" precision."

Broadcasts
On November 30, 2000, the September 20 concert at the Louisiana Superdome in New Orleans aired on Fox. The special was titled Britney Spears: There's No Place Like Home. One of the shows performed at London Arena was filmed and broadcast by Sky1.

Set list

 "(You Drive Me) Crazy"
 "Stronger"
 "What U See (Is What U Get)"
 "From the Bottom of My Broken Heart"
 "Born to Make You Happy"
 "Lucky"
 "Sometimes"
 "Don't Let Me Be the Last to Know"
 "The Beat Goes On"
 "Don't Go Knockin' on My Door"
 "(I Can't Get No) Satisfaction"
 "...Baby One More Time"
Encore
 "Oops!... I Did It Again"

Source:

Shows

Box office score data

Cancelled shows

Notes

References

 

Britney Spears concert tours
2000 concert tours